Zurmat ( / ) is a district in the Paktia Province of Afghanistan. The main town is Zurmat, which is one of the main cities of the region of Loya Paktia.

Geography
Zurmat borders Logar, Ghazni, and Paktika provinces. Tamir is the main bazaar of the district. Geographical features of Zurmat include the Shah-i-Kot Valley and the Arma Mountains.  The district contains 63 or 64 schools.  Zurmat does not receive power from the national electricity grid, so solar power and generators are prevalent.

Demographics
The population of the district is 120,000 (CSO 2004). According to the same sources, Pashtuns make up 99% of the total population followed by 1% Tajiks. Many people of Zurmat work in Arab countries like Dubai, Saudi Arabia, Qatar and Kuwait.

History
Operation Anaconda, a major battle of the War in Afghanistan, took place in Zurmat in 2002.  For the rest of the war, Zurmat has been a stronghold of the Taliban insurgency and the Haqqani network.  In 2019, the Taliban controlled 80% of the district.

References

Districts of Paktia Province